The following is a summary of Derry county football team's 2010 season.

Dr McKenna Cup
Derry were drawn in Group C of the 2010 Dr McKenna Cup along with Down, Antrim and Queen's University Belfast (QUB). Manager Damian Cassidy in his second year in charge, named a 29-man panel for the competition. The panel included many newcomers.

Derry McKenna Cup line-ups:

Group games

Section A final standings

Pos = Position; Pld = Matches played; W = Matches won; D = Matches drawn; L = Matches lost; F = Scores for; A = Goals against; SD = Score difference; Pts = Points.
2 points are awarded for a win, 1 point for a draw and 0 points for a lost. The three group winners plus best runner up went through to the semi-finals (shaded in green).

National Football League
Derry announced a 32-man panel for the 2010 National League in early February 2010. Seven newcomers to the league were included in the panel; Declan Mullan, Mark Craig, Charlie Kielt, Ciaran Mullan, Martin Dunne, Andrew McCartney and Michael Bateson. Barry Gillis, Sean Leo McGoldrick, Barry McGoldrick, Kevin McGuckin and Enda Lynn return after being rested for the McKenna Cup. Kevin McCloy is being rested ahead of the Championship, while Enda Muldoon and Coilin Devlin will miss the league through injury.

Derry National League line-ups:

Group games

Championship

Derry Championship line-ups:

Ulster Senior Football Championship

Player statistics

Minor & Under 21

Minor

Under-21

Notes and references

External links
Derry GAA official website

Date changes are agreed for some Dr McKenna Cup matches

Season Derry
Gaelic
Derry county football team seasons